Route 23, or Highway 23, can refer to:

International
 European route E23

Australia
 Federal Highway (Australia)
 Monaro Highway
 (South Australia)
 Dorat Road (not signed everywhere)

Austria
 Autobahn Südosttangente Wien

Canada
 Alberta Highway 23
 British Columbia Highway 23
 Manitoba Highway 23
 Ontario Highway 23
 Prince Edward Island Route 23
 Saskatchewan Highway 23

Costa Rica
 National Route 23

Czech Republic
 I/23 Highway; Czech: Silnice I/23

Finland
 Finnish national road 23

India
  National Highway 23 (India)

Ireland
  N23 road (Ireland)

Italy
 Autostrada A23

Japan
 Japan National Route 23
 Higashi-Meihan Expressway
 Ise Expressway

Korea, South
 National Route 23
Gukjido 23

Malaysia 

 Malaysia Federal Route 23

Mexico
Mexican Federal Highway 23

New Zealand
 State Highway 23

Norway
 Norwegian National Road 23

United Kingdom
 British A23 (Brighton-London)
 M23 (Crawley-Marling Glen)
 A23 road (Northern Ireland)

United States
 U.S. Route 23
 Alabama State Route 23
 Arkansas Highway 23
 Arkansas Highway 23W (former)
 California State Route 23
 County Route A23 (California)
 County Route J23 (California)
 Colorado State Highway 23
 Delaware Route 23
 Florida State Road 23
 Georgia State Route 23
 Illinois Route 23
 Indiana State Road 23
 Iowa Highway 23
 K-23 (Kansas highway)
 Louisiana Highway 23
 Louisiana State Route 23
 Maine State Route 23
 Maryland Route 23
Maryland Route 23B (former)
 Massachusetts Route 23
 M-23 (Michigan highway) (former)
 Minnesota State Highway 23
 County Road 23 (Anoka County, Minnesota)
 County Road 23 (Dakota County, Minnesota)
 County Road 23 (Ramsey County, Minnesota)
 Mississippi Highway 23
 Missouri Route 23
Missouri Route 23 (1922) (former)
 Montana Highway 23
 Nebraska Highway 23
 Nevada State Route 23 (former)
 New Jersey Route 23
 County Route 23 (Monmouth County, New Jersey)
 New Mexico State Road 23
 New York State Route 23
 County Route 23 (Allegany County, New York)
 County Route 23 (Cattaraugus County, New York)
 County Route 23 (Cayuga County, New York)
 County Route 23 (Clinton County, New York)
 County Route 23 (Dutchess County, New York)
 County Route 23 (Genesee County, New York)
 County Route 23B (Greene County, New York)
 County Route 23C (Greene County, New York)
 County Route 23 (Herkimer County, New York)
 County Route 23 (Lewis County, New York)
 County Route 23 (Livingston County, New York)
 County Route 23 (Niagara County, New York)
 County Route 23 (Onondaga County, New York)
 County Route 23 (Orange County, New York)
 County Route 23 (Oswego County, New York)
 County Route 23 (Otsego County, New York)
 County Route 23 (Putnam County, New York)
 County Route 23 (Rensselaer County, New York)
 County Route 23 (Rockland County, New York)
 County Route 23 (Schuyler County, New York)
 County Route 23 (St. Lawrence County, New York)
 County Route 23 (Suffolk County, New York)
 County Route 23 (Sullivan County, New York)
 County Route 23 (Tioga County, New York)
 County Route 23 (Warren County, New York)
 County Route 23 (Washington County, New York)
 North Carolina Highway 23 (former)
 North Dakota Highway 23
 North Dakota Highway 23B (McKenzie County)
 North Dakota Highway 23B (Mountrail County)
 Ohio State Route 23 (1923-1927) (former)
 Oklahoma State Highway 23
 Oregon Route 23 (former)
 Pennsylvania Route 23
 South Carolina Highway 23
 South Dakota Highway 23 (former)
 Tennessee State Route 23
 Texas State Highway 23
 Texas State Highway Loop 23 (former)
 Texas State Highway Spur 23 (former)
 Farm to Market Road 23
 Texas Park Road 23
 Utah State Route 23
 Vermont Route 23
 State Route 23 (Virginia 1918-1933) (former)
 Washington State Route 23
 West Virginia Route 23
 Wisconsin Highway 23

Territories
 Puerto Rico Highway 23

See also
List of A23 roads
List of highways numbered 23A